Postmodern philosophy is a philosophical movement that arose in the second half of the 20th century as a critical response to assumptions allegedly present in modernist philosophical ideas regarding culture, identity, history, or language that were developed during the 18th-century Age of Enlightenment.  Postmodernist thinkers developed concepts like difference, repetition, trace, and hyperreality to subvert "grand narratives", univocity of being, and epistemic certainty. Postmodern philosophy questions the importance of power relationships, personalization, and discourse in the "construction" of truth and world views. Many postmodernists appear to deny that an objective reality exists, and appear to deny that there are objective moral values.

Jean-François Lyotard defined philosophical postmodernism in The Postmodern Condition, writing "Simplifying to the extreme, I define postmodern as incredulity towards meta narratives...." where what he means by metanarrative is something like a unified, complete, universal, and epistemically certain story about everything that is. Postmodernists reject metanarratives because they reject the conceptualization of truth that metanarratives presuppose. Postmodernist philosophers in general argue that truth is always contingent on historical and social context rather than being absolute and universal and that truth is always partial and "at issue" rather than being complete and certain.

Postmodern philosophy is often particularly skeptical about simple binary oppositions characteristic of structuralism, emphasizing the problem of the philosopher cleanly distinguishing knowledge from ignorance, social progress from reversion, dominance from submission, good from bad, and presence from absence. But, for the same reasons, postmodern philosophy should often be particularly skeptical about the complex spectral characteristics of things, emphasizing the problem of the philosopher again cleanly distinguishing concepts, for a concept must be understood in the context of its opposite, such as existence and nothingness, normality and abnormality, speech and writing, and the like.

Subjects

On Literature 
Postmodern philosophy has had strong relations with the substantial literature of critical theory, although some critical theorists such as Jurgen Habermas have opposed postmodern philosophy.

On The Enlightenment 
Many postmodern claims are critical of certain 18th-century Enlightenment values. Some postmodernists tolerate multiple conceptions of morality, even if they disagree with them subjectively. Postmodern writings often focus on deconstructing the role that power and ideology play in shaping discourse and belief. Postmodern philosophy shares ontological similarities with classical skeptical and relativistic belief systems.

On Truth and Objectivity 
The Routledge Encyclopedia of Philosophy states that "The assumption that there is no common denominator in 'nature' or 'truth' ... that guarantees the possibility of neutral or objective thought" is a key assumption of postmodernism. The National Research Council has characterized the belief that "social science research can never generate objective or trustworthy knowledge" as an example of a postmodernist belief. Jean-François Lyotard's seminal 1979 The Postmodern Condition stated that its hypotheses "should not be accorded predictive value in relation to reality, but strategic value in relation to the questions raised". Lyotard's statement in 1984 that "I define postmodern as incredulity toward meta-narratives" extends to incredulity toward science. Jacques Derrida, who is generally identified as a postmodernist, stated that "every referent, all reality has the structure of a differential trace". Paul Feyerabend, one of the most famous twentieth-century philosophers of science, is often classified as a postmodernist; Feyerabend held that modern science is no more justified than witchcraft, and has denounced the "tyranny" of "abstract concepts such as 'truth', 'reality', or 'objectivity', which narrow people's vision and ways of being in the world". Feyerabend also defended astrology, adopted alternative medicine, and sympathized with creationism. Defenders of postmodernism state that many descriptions of postmodernism exaggerate its antipathy to science; for example, Feyerabend denied that he was "anti-science", accepted that some scientific theories are superior to other theories (even if science itself is not superior to other modes of inquiry), and attempted conventional medical treatments during his fight against cancer.

Influences 
 
Postmodern philosophy originated primarily in France during the mid-20th century. However, several philosophical antecedents inform many of postmodern philosophy's concerns.

It was greatly influenced by the writings of Søren Kierkegaard and Friedrich Nietzsche in the 19th century and other early-to-mid 20th-century philosophers, including phenomenologists Edmund Husserl and Martin Heidegger, psychoanalyst Jacques Lacan, structuralist Roland Barthes, Georges Bataille, and the later work of Ludwig Wittgenstein. Postmodern philosophy also drew from the world of the arts and architecture, particularly Marcel Duchamp, John Cage and artists who practiced collage, and the architecture of Las Vegas and the Pompidou Centre.

Postmodern Philosophers

Michel Foucalt 
Michel Foucault is often cited as an early postmodernist although he personally rejected that label. Following Nietzsche, Foucault argued that knowledge is produced through the operations of power, and changes fundamentally in different historical periods.

Jean Baudrillard
Baudrillard, known for his simulation theory, argued that the individual's experience and perception of reality derives its basis entirely from media-propagated ideals and images. The real and fantasy become indistinguishable, leading to the emergence of a wide-spread simulation of reality.

Jean François Lyotard 
The writings of Lyotard were largely concerned with the role of narrative in human culture, and particularly how that role has changed as we have left modernity and entered a "postindustrial" or postmodern condition.  He argued that modern philosophies legitimized their truth-claims not (as they themselves claimed) on logical or empirical grounds, but rather on the grounds of accepted stories (or "metanarratives") about knowledge and the world—comparing these with Wittgenstein's concept of language-games.  He further argued that in our postmodern condition, these metanarratives no longer work to legitimize truth-claims.  He suggested that in the wake of the collapse of modern metanarratives, people are developing a new "language-game"—one that does not make claims to absolute truth but rather celebrates a world of ever-changing relationships (among people and between people and the world).

Jacques Derrida 
Derrida, the father of deconstruction, practiced philosophy as a form of textual criticism.  He criticized Western philosophy as privileging the concept of presence and logos, as opposed to absence and markings or writings.

Richard Rorty
In the United States, a well-knownpragmatist and self-proclaimed postmodernist was Richard Rorty.  An analytic philosopher, Rorty believed that combining Willard Van Orman Quine's criticism of the analytic-synthetic distinction with Wilfrid Sellars's critique of the "Myth of the Given" allowed for an abandonment of the view of the thought or language as a mirror of a reality or external world.  Further, drawing upon Donald Davidson's criticism of the dualism between conceptual scheme and empirical content, he challenges the sense of questioning whether our particular concepts are related to the world in an appropriate way, whether we can justify our ways of describing the world as compared with other ways.  He argued that truth was not about getting it right or representing reality, but was part of a social practice and language was what served our purposes in a particular time; ancient languages are sometimes untranslatable into modern ones because they possess a different vocabulary and are unuseful today.  Donald Davidson is not usually considered a postmodernist, although he and Rorty have both acknowledged that there are few differences between their philosophies.

Criticism 

Criticisms of postmodernism, while intellectually diverse, share the opinion that it lacks coherence and is hostile to notions such as truth, logic, and objectivity. Specifically, it is held that postmodernism can be meaningless, promotes obscurantism and uses relativism (in culture, morality, knowledge) to the extent that it cripples most judgement calls.

Definitional issues 
Catholic philosopher and semiotician John Deely has argued for the contentious claim that the label "postmodern" for thinkers such as Derrida et al. is premature.  Insofar as the "so-called" postmoderns follow the thoroughly modern trend of idealism, it is more an ultramodernism than anything else. A postmodernism that lives up to its name, therefore, must no longer confine itself to the premodern preoccupation with "things" nor with the modern confinement to "ideas", but must come to terms with the way of signs embodied in the semiotic doctrines of such thinkers as the Portuguese philosopher John Poinsot and the American philosopher Charles Sanders Peirce. Writes Deely,
The epoch of Greek and Latin philosophy was based on being in a quite precise sense: the existence exercised by things independently of human apprehension and attitude. The much briefer epoch of modern philosophy based itself rather on the instruments of human knowing, but in a way that unnecessarily compromised being. As the 20th century ends, there is reason to believe that a new philosophical epoch is dawning along with the new century, promising to be the richest epoch yet for human understanding. The postmodern era is positioned to synthesize at a higher level—the level of experience, where the being of things and the activity of the finite knower compenetrate one another and provide the materials whence can be derived knowledge of nature and knowledge of culture in their full symbiosis—the achievements of the ancients and the moderns in a way that gives full credit to the preoccupations of the two. The postmodern era has for its distinctive task in philosophy the exploration of a new path, no longer the ancient way of things nor the modern way of ideas, but the way of signs, whereby the peaks and valleys of ancient and modern thought alike can be surveyed and cultivated by a generation which has yet further peaks to climb and valleys to find.

See also 

Hyperreality
Natural philosophy
Ontological pluralism
Physical ontology
Postmaterialism
Postmodern art
Postmodernism
Postmodernity

Notes

Further reading 
 Charles Arthur Willard Liberalism and the Problem of Knowledge: A New Rhetoric for Modern Democracy. University of Chicago Press. 1996.
 John Deely "Quid sit Postmodernismus?," in Roman Ciapalo (ed.) Postmodernism and Christian philosophy, 68–96, Washington, D.C.: Catholic University of America Press. 1997.

External links

 Modern Philosophical Discussions

 
 
Philosophical schools and traditions